Ermanno Brignoli (born 31 August 1969) is a former Italian cyclist.

Grand Tour general classification results timeline

References

1969 births
Living people
Italian male cyclists
Cyclists from the Province of Bergamo